Palangari-ye Kohneh (also Romanized as Pālangarī-ye Kohneh) is a village in Kamfiruz-e Shomali Rural District, Kamfiruz District, Marvdasht County, Fars Province, Iran. At the 2006 census, its population was 348, in 80 families.

References 

Populated places in Marvdasht County